Sonja Irene Sjøli (born 6 June 1949 in Hamar) is a Norwegian politician representing the Conservative Party. She is currently a representative of Akershus in the Storting and was first elected in 1997.

Parliamentary committee duties 
2005–2009 member of the Healthcare committee.
2005–2009 member of the Electoral committee.
2005–2009 second vice-leader of the Accreditation committee.
2001–2005 leader of the Family, Culture and Administration committee.
2001–2005 member of the Accreditation committee.
2001–2005 reserve member of the Extended Foreign Affairs committee.
2001–2005 reserve member of the Electoral committee.
1997–2001 member of the Welfare committee.
2001–2005 vice-secretary of the Storting.

External links

1949 births
Living people
Women members of the Storting
Conservative Party (Norway) politicians
Members of the Storting
21st-century Norwegian politicians
21st-century Norwegian women politicians
20th-century Norwegian politicians
20th-century Norwegian women politicians